The 1989 Western Kentucky Hilltoppers football team represented Western Kentucky University as an independent during the 1989 NCAA Division I-AA football season Led by first-year head coach Jack Harbaugh, the Hilltoppers compiled a record of 6–5.

Schedule

References

Western Kentucky
Western Kentucky Hilltoppers football seasons
Western Kentucky Hilltoppers football